This is a list of rivers of Nigeria. This list is arranged by drainage basin and from west to east, with respective tributaries indented under each larger stream's name.

Atlantic Ocean
Ouémé River
Okpara River
Ogun River
Oyan River
Ofiki River
Ona River (Awna River)
Ogunpa River
Osun River
Erinle River
Otin River
Oba River
Omi Osun
Benin River
Osse River
Niger River
Escravos River (distributary)
Forcados River (distributary)
Chanomi Creek (distributary)
Nun River (distributary)
New Calabar River (distributary)
Anambra River
Benue River
Okwa River
Mada River
Katsina Ala River
Menchum River
Ankwe River
Donga River
Bantaji River (Suntai River)
Wase River
Taraba River
Kam River
Pai River
Gongola River
Hawal River
Faro River
Gurara River
Kaduna River
Mariga River
Tubo River
Galma River (Nigeria)
Moshi River
Teshi River
Oli River
Malendo River
Sokoto River
Ka River
Zamfara River
Gaminda River
Rima River
Goulbi de Maradi River
Gagere River
Bunsuru River
Bonny River
Imo River
Aba River
Otamiri River
Kwa Ibo River
Cross River
Akwayafe River
Great Kwa River
Calabar River 
Asu River
Aboine River
Ekulu River
Anyim River

Lake Chad
Yobe River
Komadugu Gana River
Jama'are River (Bunga River)
Katagum River
Hadejia River
Chalawa River
Kano River
Watari River
Ngadda River
Yedseram River

References
Prentice-Hall, Inc., American World Atlas 1985
Army Map Service 1967
 GEOnet Names Server

Nigeria
Rivers